(June 19, 1698 – November 9, 1769) was a Confucian scholar, minor hatamoto and pioneer rangaku scholar in early Edo period Japan. He is also credited with introducing the cultivation of sweet potato to many parts of Japan.

Biography
Aoki was born in the Nihonbashi district of Edo, as the first son of a fishmonger Tsukudaya Han’emon. Nothing is known about his childhood or early education. He later studied Confucianism in Kyoto under Itō Tōgai, the son and successor of the famous Confucian philosopher Itō Jinsai. After his return in Edo, he was given access to the Tokugawa shogunate's library, the Momijiyama-bunko, within Edo Castle in 1733 through the intercession of Ōoka Tadasuke, the Edo machi-bugyō. During the middle of the Edo period, Japan frequently suffered from crop failures caused by inclement weather and natural disasters, resulting in widespread famine and political and social unrest. This included the Kyōhō famine of 1732 to 1733, which resulted in a population loss of 20% in some areas of western Japan. However, it came to Aoki's attention that the island of Ōmishima in the Seto Inland Sea had largely escaped the effects of the famine as the islanders had planted a new type of sweet potato which had been grown in Satsuma Province since 1711. This new Satsuma-imo had arrived in Ming China from South America via the Philippines and to Satsuma from their overlordship over the Ryūkyū islands. Aoki wrote a treatise called "Thoughts on the Barbarian Yams" describing the new food source, which caught the attention of senior officials. He was appointed to an official post as "Satsuma-imo commissioner", thus making a change in status from a commoner to a samurai. In his new position he oversaw the successful cultivation of the new crop at the government's Koishikawa Botanical Garden and at experimental fields at villages called Makuwari (present day Hanamigawa-ku, Chiba) and Fudōdō (present day Kujūkuri, Chiba). The new crop proved to be an invaluable source of food in later famines. The village of Makuwari is now called Makuhari in what is now Chiba Prefecture, and the site of the experimental sweet potato field is a Chiba Prefectural Historic Site

In 1739, Aoki was entrusted with the acquisition of books and writings for the Momijiyama-bunko, and in this position he gathered historical documents from Kai, Shinano, Mikawa Province, and other locations, which he copied and annotated under the title "Ancient writings in some provinces" (Shoshū komonjo).

In 1740, together with the doctor and herbalist Noro Genjō (野呂元丈, 1693–1761), he was assigned to learn the Dutch language. Since the middle of the 17th century, translation and interpretation between the Japanese and Dutch East India Company post at Dejima in Nagasaki has been a monopoly held by a small group of hereditary "Dutch interpreters" who were appointed and supervised by the local governor. Under the Shogun Tokugawa Yoshimune this monopoly was broken, and the official policy of the government changed to more intensively acquire and disseminate European technology. Aoki moved to Nagasaki for a short time and was able to master Dutch to the extent that he wrote introductions to the Dutch language and script and produced fragmentary translations from Dutch works on natural science and herbology. Although he not get beyond comparatively rudimentary language skills and rough translations, he became a model for other scholars and the forerunner of the field of study which was later termed rangaku.

In 1744 Aoki was appointed fire guard of the Momijiyama-bunko library. Three years later he was transferred to the Hyōjōsho, the senior council within the shogunal administration. In 1767 he was appointed administrator of the Momijiyama-bunko library. Aoki died in 1769 during an influenza epidemic at the age of 72.

His grave at the temple of Ryūsen-ji in Meguro, Tokyo was designated a National Historic Site in 1943.

Bibliography 
 Shoshū komonjo, 
 Banshokō, 1735 
 Oranda bunyaku, 
 Sōro zatsudan, 1738  
 Oranda moji ryakkō,  
 Keizai sanyō, 
 Kansho no ki, 1745

References
 Sugimoto, Tsutomu: Aoki Konyō to rango no gakushū. In: Sugimoto T.: Edojidai rangogaku no seiritsu to sono tenkai II. Tōkyō: Waseda Daigaku Shuppanbu, 1977, S. 49–170

External links
Meguro Ward home page 
Tokyo Cultural Properties database 

1698 births
1769 deaths
Rangaku
Hatamoto
Japanese Confucianists
Japanese writers of the Edo period
18th-century Japanese scientists
18th-century Japanese translators
Japanese agricultural scientists
Deaths from influenza